The Manitoba Real Estate Association (MREA) a trade association that represents real estate brokers, agents, and salespeople in Manitoba, Canada.
Its membership includes more than 2100 individuals, who work through one of Manitoba's four real estate boards:
 Winnipeg Real Estate Board (WRREB) — in and around the Winnipeg Metro Region; founded in 1903, making it one of the longest-running real estate boards in Canada
Brandon Area REALTORS (formerly Brandon Real Estate Board) — in and around the Brandon area
 Portage la Prairie Real Estate Board — in Portage la Prairie
 Thompson Real Estate Board — in Thompson

See also
 Canadian Real Estate Association
National Association of Realtors (USA)
 Multiple Listing Service

External links
 Manitoba Real Estate Association
 Manitoba Securities Commission, Real Estate Advisory Council
 Real Estate Business Brokers Act, C.C.S.M. c. R20

References

Real estate industry trade groups based in Canada
Trade associations based in Manitoba
1903 establishments in Manitoba
Economy of Manitoba